The temperate rainforests of Admiralty Island's Kootznoowoo Wilderness are unique among the  of federally protected Wilderness in Southeast Alaska.

The island's towering cathedrals of old growth Sitka spruce and western hemlock could not be more different from the glaciers and alpine tundra found in nearby Wilderness Areas such as Tracy Arm or Misty Fjords.

These ancient forests are home to the highest concentrations of brown bears in the world, as well as thousands of bald eagles, Sitka Black-tailed Deer, boreal toads, and all five species of Alaskan salmon.

The Kootznoowoo Wilderness includes most of Admiralty Island, except for the Mansfield Peninsula, the village of Angoon, and Native lands along the island's western shore.

The Wilderness is part of Admiralty Island National Monument, which itself is part of Tongass National Forest.

References
 Wilderness profile

ANILCA establishments
IUCN Category Ib
Protected areas of Hoonah–Angoon Census Area, Alaska
Protected areas of Juneau, Alaska
Wilderness areas of the Tongass National Forest